Riyaad Norodien (born 26 March 1995) is a South African professional footballer who plays as a midfielder for Kiyovu based club Kiyovu.

Early career
Born in Kensington, Cape Town, Norodien signed with local club Ajax Cape Town as a youngster. He was named Academy Player of the Year in 2012. In May 2015, he travelled with the Ajax Cape Town U19 team to Germany to compete in the Ergenzingen Tournament, where they were eliminated by Mexican side Guadalajara in the semi-finals. Norodien, however, was named Player of the Tournament, and caught the attention of various European clubs (including AFC Ajax).

Professional career

Club career
On 4 April 2015, after a lengthy contract dispute, Norodien finally made his first professional appearance when he featured during a 2–1 loss to Platinum Stars. One month later, he scored his first professional goal, a close-range header, against Moroka Swallows. He followed it up by scoring against Orlando Pirates in the next game on 9 May (also the last game of the season). He received a pass from a goal-kick, juked two defenders and blasted the ball past Brighton Mhlongo for his second career goal. With his help, Ajax CP reached the finals of the 2014–15 Nedbank Cup. After only a month in the league, he had "taken the domestic game by storm," impressing teams both in South Africa and abroad.

International career
Norodien was selected to represent South Africa at the 2015 Africa U-23 Cup of Nations in Senegal, where the top three teams qualify for the 2016 Summer Olympics. He played in three games (against Senegal, Zambia and Algeria). South Africa finished in third place overall, qualifying for the Olympic tourney in Rio de Janeiro.

International goals
Scores and results list South Africa's goal tally first.

Honours

Club
Ajax Cape Town
 Nedbank Cup: Runner-up 2014–15
 MTN 8 Cup: 2015

References

External links

 
 
 SoccerPunter profile

Living people
1995 births
South African soccer players
Association football midfielders
Cape Town Spurs F.C. players
Orlando Pirates F.C. players
Platinum Stars F.C. players
Cape Town City F.C. (2016) players
Cape Umoya United F.C. players
National First Division players
South African Premier Division players
Sportspeople from Cape Town